Abdellatif Salef is a Moroccan football manager, who was most recently manager of Somalia.

Managerial career
In October 2012, Salef replaced Michel De Wolf as manager of Belgian club Bleid-Gaume, before being replaced by De Wolf as manager just a month later.

On 26 May 2021, the Somali Football Federation announced the appointment of Salef as manager of Somalia on a two-year contract. On 15 June 2021, hours before Somalia were due to play Djibouti in a friendly, Salef resigned  from his position due to incompatibility with the head of the Somali football association on how to select players for the Somali national team. He putted forward that it doesn’t matter whether players were from the local competition or those playing abroad. The most deserving players should be called up. According to Salef, local players were treated unfairly in that matter.

References

Living people
Date of birth missing (living people)
Moroccan football managers
Somalia national football team managers
Dutch sportspeople of Moroccan descent
Expatriate football managers in Somalia
Year of birth missing (living people)
Moroccan expatriate football managers
Moroccan expatriate sportspeople in Somalia